Bilak may refer to:

 Vasil Biľak (1917), Slovak communist leader
 Peter Biľak (1973), Slovak graphic designer
 Bilak, the Hungarian name for Domneşti village, Mărișelu Commune, Bistriţa-Năsăud County, Romania
Igor Bilak(1972), Serbian photographer

Surnames